Kowraki (also Romanized as Kowrakī and Koorki) is a village in Rahmatabad Rural District, Zarqan District, Shiraz County, Fars Province, Iran. At the 2006 census, its population was 571, in 152 families.

References 

Populated places in Zarqan County